The Azerbaijan national under-20 football team are a feeder team for the main Azerbaijan national football team. It was founded in 2015. The team is controlled by the AFFA.

Schedule and results

2018

Current squad
Azerbaijan under-20 national team had a training camp on May 12-28, 2018 in Baku.
The list of the players, who invited to the training process, was as below:

Caps and goals as May 27, 2018 after the game against Macedonia.

Recent call-ups
The following players have also been called up to the Azerbaijan squad within the last 12 months and are still available for selection.

Notes
INJ = Not part of the current squad due to injury.
PRE = Preliminary squad
RET = Retired from international football.

Coaching staff

See also
 Azerbaijan national football team
 Azerbaijan national under-23 football team
 Azerbaijan national under-21 football team
 Azerbaijan national under-19 football team
 Azerbaijan national under-18 football team
 Azerbaijan national under-17 football team

References

European national under-20 association football teams
Under-20
Youth football in Azerbaijan